Another Life is an American science fiction drama television series created by Aaron Martin, which premiered on Netflix on July 25, 2019. The series stars Katee Sackhoff, Selma Blair, Justin Chatwin, Samuel Anderson, Elizabeth Ludlow, Blu Hunt, A.J. Rivera, Alexander Eling, Alex Ozerov, Jake Abel, JayR Tinaco, Lina Renna, Jessica Camacho, Barbara Williams, Parveen Dosanjh, Greg Hovanessian, Chanelle Peloso and Tyler Hoechlin. In October 2019, the series was renewed for a second season, which was released on October 14, 2021. Netflix announced it had canceled the series in February 2022.

Synopsis
An unidentified flying object shaped like a large Möbius strip lands on Earth and grows a crystalline tower above it. Erik Wallace, a scientist employed by the United States Interstellar Command (USIC), attempts to communicate with the alien structure.

Meanwhile, Wallace's wife, veteran Captain Niko Breckinridge, takes the spaceship Salvare (meaning 'to save' in Latin) and its young crew to determine the origin of the artifact and establish contact with the aliens who sent it. The Salvare is capable of faster-than-light (FTL) travel, and carries most of its crew asleep in hibernation pods (soma on the show), to be awakened when needed.

Cast and characters

Main

 Katee Sackhoff as Niko Breckinridge, astronaut and commanding officer of the Salvare, on a mission to determine the origin of the alien artifact. Niko's previous ship, the Pilgrim, suffered a disaster which killed ten people, including August's brother and Niko's commander and romantic partner Hudson.
 Justin Chatwin as Erik Wallace, a scientist employed by United States Interstellar Command, dedicated to finding extraterrestrial intelligent life; he is Niko's husband and Jana's father. On Earth, he investigates the crystalline structure created by the UFO.
 Samuel Anderson as William, the holographic interface of the sentient artificial intelligence aboard the Salvare. He serves as an advisor and friend to Niko throughout season one, and even stands up for her during times of need. He is seen as a real person by Niko, but nobody else. After being infected by the alternate AI Gabriel, William is deleted in order to destroy him and reinstalled as a new "factory reset" version of himself with none of William's memories or experiences. 
 Blu Hunt as August Catawnee (season 1; guest season 2), the lead engineer and youngest crewmember of the Salvare. Her brother died previously under Niko's command. 
 A.J. Rivera as Bernie Martinez, Salvare's microbiologist and part-time chef. 
 Jake Abel as Sasha Harrison (season 1), the son of the U.S. Secretary of Defense, serving as the government's representative and diplomatic liaison aboard Salvare. He is seen as weak and is often not trusted by his crewmates. 
 Alex Ozerov as Oliver Sokolov (season 1; guest season 2), a Salvare engineer. 
 Alexander Eling as Javier Almanzar, a former hacker who is aboard Salvare as an expert in computer engineering. 
 JayR Tinaco as Zayn Petrossian, Salvare's medic. Zayn is non-binary.
 Lina Renna as Jana Breckinridge-Wallace, the daughter of Niko and Erik.
 Selma Blair as Harper Glass (season 1; archive footage season 2), a media influencer who attempts to break one of the biggest stories in human history. Like Sasha, she becomes infected with an Achaian implant. 
 Elizabeth Ludlow as Cas Isakovic, Niko's second-in-command and pilot of Salvare. She is awakened in episode 2.
 Tongayi Chirisa as Richard Ncube (season 2)
 Dillon Casey as Seth Gage (season 2), a government official who eventually becomes the emissary for the Achaia.

Recurring
 Tyler Hoechlin as Ian Yerxa (season 1), Niko's initial second-in-command, and the previous commander of the Salvare. Yerxa is killed in the second episode.
 Jessica Camacho as Michelle Vargas (season 1), Salvare's communications expert, who dies after exposure to exotic matter. 
 Barbara Williams as General Blair Dubois, United States Interstellar Command, in charge of the U.S.'s efforts determine the intent to the artifact.
 Greg Hovanessian as Beauchamp McCarry, Niko's third-in-command and pilot of Salvare, awakened in episode 7. Beauchamp is gay and married, with a husband on Earth. Beauchamp is killed by planetary debris in episode 1 of season 2.
 Parveen Dosanjh as Dr. Nani Singh, a scientist; Erik's friend and co-worker.
 Chanelle Peloso as Petra Smith (season 1), a Salvare crewmember. Petra dies from an extraterrestrial virus in the third episode. 
 Shannon Chan-Kent as Iara (season 2), a half Achaian AI inadvertently created by William at the end of the first season.
 Kurt Yaeger as Dillon Conner (season 2)
 Carlena Britch as Paula Carbone (season 2), the head of the colonists onboard the Salvare. After mutinying, Paula is later discovered partially transformed aboard a crashed alien ship by Niko who mercy kills Paula at her own request.
 Kate Vernon as Ava Breckenridge (season 2), Niko's estranged mother who is also used as an avatar by the Achaians.
 Rekha Sharma as Ursula Monroe (season 2), the software engineer responsible for the development of the AIs William and Gabriel.

Guest cast
 Allan Hawco as Gabriel (season 2), the Salvare's original AI before the ship was upgraded with William. After Gabriel causes trouble and nearly kills the crew, he is deleted at the cost of William's memories.

Episodes

Season 1 (2019)

Season 2 (2021)

Production

Development
On April 26, 2018, Netflix announced that it had given the production a series order for a ten-episode first season. The series is created by Aaron Martin who is also credited as an executive producer alongside Noreen Halpern and Chris Regina. On June 19, 2019, it was confirmed that the series would premiere on July 25, 2019. On October 29, 2019, Netflix renewed the series for a second season which was released on October 14, 2021. Sackhoff revealed in February 2022 the series was canceled.

Casting
On April 26, 2018, it was announced that Katee Sackhoff had been cast as a series regular. On August 21, 2018, it was reported that Selma Blair had joined the cast in a recurring role. On August 28, 2018, it was announced that Tyler Hoechlin, Justin Chatwin, Samuel Anderson, and Elizabeth Ludlow had joined the cast. The following day, Blu Hunt joined the cast. In September 2018, the rest of the main cast was revealed. On June 23, 2020, Tongayi Chirisa was cast as a series regular while Dillon Casey, Shannon Chan-Kent, and Kurt Yaeger joined the cast in recurring roles for the second season. In December 2020, it was announced that Carlena Britch had been cast in the recurring role of Paula Carbone for the second season.

Filming
Filming for the first season took place on location in Vancouver, British Columbia, from August 20, 2018, to November 20, 2018. Filming for the second season was expected to begin on March 2, 2020, and conclude on June 9, 2020, but was put on hold due to COVID-19 pandemic. Filming for the second season resumed on August 28, 2020, and was scheduled to conclude on November 24, 2020. Filming was delayed once again and instead concluded in December of that year.

Reception 

Review aggregator website Rotten Tomatoes reports that 6% of 18 critic ratings are positive for Season 1, with an average rating of 4.54/10. The website's consensus reads, "A hodgepodge of science fiction homage, Another Life lacks the distinctive spark necessary to set it apart from the array of stories it aspires to be". Season 2 has only four critic ratings on Rotten Tomatoes, one short of the minimum five necessary for a score or consensus, but three out of four reviews are negative (though generally stating season 2 was an improvement over season 1), giving it an unofficial 25% rating with an average of 5.625/10. Metacritic calculated an average score of 33 out of 100, based on 8 reviews, citing "generally unfavorable reviews".

References

External links
 
 

2010s American drama television series
2010s American science fiction television series
2019 American television series debuts
2020s American drama television series
2020s American science fiction television series
2021 American television series endings
English-language Netflix original programming
Serial drama television series
Space adventure television series
Television series about extraterrestrial life
Television series set on fictional planets